Guy Thibault (born 30 June 1964) is a Canadian speed skater. He competed at the 1988 Winter Olympics and the 1992 Winter Olympics.

References

External links
 

1964 births
Living people
Canadian male speed skaters
Olympic speed skaters of Canada
Speed skaters at the 1988 Winter Olympics
Speed skaters at the 1992 Winter Olympics
Speed skaters from Quebec City
20th-century Canadian people